Celltick Technologies is a US-based telecom technology provider specializing in public warning systems, cell broadcasting and mass notification platforms. The company is also known for creating software applications which are used by mobile carriers, OEM and governmental organizations.

History 

Ronen Daniel co-founded Celltick technologies in the year 2000. In 2005, the company raised $11 million from Amadeus Capital Partners and Jerusalem Venture Partners while in the verge of expanding on western Europe.

In pre-android era, during the year 2002, Celltick released its first product  a software solution named as LiveScreen, for mobile operators which invited considerable media attentions in subsequent years. The software solution was aiming to deliver mobile contents and services directly to the handset of the consumers. Later on, the solution was extended on symbian os, for the handsets manufactured by Nokia. The software solution had an applet embedded within the SIM card. LiveScreen is currently being used by multiple mobile operators worldwide to date including BSNL, Airtel, Tele2, Vodafone, Taiwan Mobile, Globe Telcom Philippines etc.

In 2013, Celltick released the Start interface for android based handsets, which was utilized by multiple mobile operators and device manufacturers reaching around 150 million installations. In 2019, the Start division was acquired by Taboola.

In January 2021, Frykhammar, former CFO and CEO of Ericsson joined Celltick as chairman of the board. Subsequently, Celltick is known for providing services to mobile operators and governments in Europe to meet the requirements of Article 110 in the legislation of the European Electronic Communications Code, mandating all member states to deploy a mobile public warning system by June 2022.

References 

Mobile content
Emergency communication
Health care companies established in 2000
Mobile software distribution platforms